The Turkmenistan women's national basketball team is the women's basketball side that represents Turkmenistan in international competitions.

Competition records

Discovery Women’s Basketball Invitational
 Bronze: 1 (2015)

References

Basketball in Turkmenistan
Women's national basketball teams
Basketball